Rabie Chaki (born 14 April 1982) is a Moroccan former professional tennis player.

Born in Tangier, Chaki was a France-based player and had a career best singles ranking of 338 in the world, winning eight ITF Futures titles. On the ATP Tour, he featured in the singles main draw at two editions of the Grand Prix Hassan II, including in 2009 when he troubled the top seed Igor Andreev in the first round, losing 5–7 in the third set.

Chaki played for the Morocco Davis Cup team between 2006 and 2010, appearing in a total of 13 ties. He had wins in 11 singles rubbers, which included victories over Malek Jaziri, Luka Gregorc, Frederik Nielsen and Dawid Olejniczak.

ITF Futures titles

Singles: (8)

Doubles: (8)

See also
List of Morocco Davis Cup team representatives

References

External links
 
 
 
 

1982 births
Living people
Moroccan male tennis players
Moroccan expatriates in France
People from Tangier